Knocking on Heaven’s Door: How Physics and Scientific Thinking Illuminate the Universe and the Modern World is the second non-fiction book by Lisa Randall. It was initially published on September 20, 2011, by Ecco Press. The title is explained in the text: "Scientists knock on heaven's door in an attempt to cross the threshold separating the known from the unknown."

Review

—American Scientist

See also
Higgs boson
Higgs mechanism

References

External links

2011 non-fiction books
Popular physics books
Works about particle physics
String theory books
Cosmology books
Ecco Press books